Guy Cavagnac (15 September 1934 – 7 January 2022) was a French independent filmmaker.

Life and career
After his studies at the Institut des hautes études cinématographiques, Cavagnac shot several commissioned short films and served as an assistant to Jean Renoir. In 1970, he founded the production enterprise Unité 3 alongside Paul Vecchiali and Liliane de Kermadec. That year, he released , presented at the Rencontres du Jeune Cinéma in Bourges in 1971.

Cavagnac died on 7 January 2022, at the age of 87.

Filmography

Director
Le Soldat Laforêt (1970)

Producer
Le Soldat Laforêt (1970)
 (1972)
 (1972)
Aloïse (1975)
Jeanne Dielman, 23 quai du Commerce, 1080 Bruxelles (1975)
 (1988)
 (1990)

Assistant director
 (1966)
The Cop (1970)
 (1974)

Publications
Villefranche-de-Rouergue : Histoire et génie du lieu (1991)
Jean Renoir : Le Désir du monde (1994)
Baroque occitan (1996)
Une partie de campagne : Eli Lotar, photographies du tournage (2007)

References

1934 births
2022 deaths
French film directors
French film producers
Film people from Paris